The TCR is a regulations for the several national, regional and international touring car racing series, or for the one category of them, to the most successful competitors each season. Since the first full seasons in 2015, championships have been awarded to the highest finishing drivers and teams.

Current championships/categories

Main Series

FIA World Touring Car Cup

TCR Asia Series
 Drivers' Championship

Teams' Championship

Amateurs' Championship

Drivers' Cup

Model of the year

TCR Trophy Europe
Drivers' Championship

24H Series
Drivers' Championship

Touring Car Endurance Series
Drivers' Championship

Asia

TCR China Touring Car Championship
Drivers' Championship

TCR Thailand Touring Car Championship
Pro-Am Championship

Am Championship

TCR Middle East Series
Drivers' Championship

Europe

ADAC TCR Germany Touring Car Championship
Drivers' Championship

Teams' Championship

Juniors' Championship

ADAC TCR Germany Honda Rookie Challenge

TCR Baltic Trophy
Drivers' Championship

TCR BeNeLux Touring Car Championship
Drivers' championship

Juniors' Championship

Teams' Championship

Model of the year

TCR CER Spain
Drivers' Championship

TCR Ibérico Touring Car Series
Drivers' championship

TCR Italy Touring Car Championship
Drivers' championship

 DSG Trophy

 U25 Trophy

 TCR Constructors' championship

TCR Portugal Touring Car Championship
Drivers' championship

TCR Russian Touring Car Championship
Drivers' championship

Teams' championship

TCR Scandinavia Touring Car Championship
Drivers' Championship

Veranstaltergemeinschaft Langstreckenpokal Nürburgring (VLN)
Drivers' Championship

Defunct championships/categories

TCR International Series
Drivers' Championship

Teams' Championship

OMP Trophy
All drivers displaying an OMP are eligible for the  OMP Trophy. Points are awarded for championships and the use of OMP safety equipment. At the end of the season, the top four drivers win a cash prize.

Model of the year

European Touring Car Cup
Drivers' championship

Notes

References

External links
 
 Touring Car Times

champions
TCR Series champions
TCR Series